Chatham Township may refer to the following townships in the United States:

 Chatham Township, Sangamon County, Illinois
 Chatham Township, Wright County, Minnesota
 Chatham Township, New Jersey
 Chatham Township, Medina County, Ohio
 Chatham Township, Ontario
 Chatham Township, Tioga County, Pennsylvania